Arunodaya University is a private university located in Itanagar, Arunachal Pradesh, India.

References

External links
 Arunodaya University

Private universities in India
Universities in Arunachal Pradesh
Education in Itanagar
Educational institutions established in 2014
2014 establishments in Arunachal Pradesh